FOX 34 may refer to one of the following television stations in the United States affiliated with the Fox Broadcasting Company:

Current
KJTV-TV in Lubbock, Texas
KLSR-TV in Eugene, Oregon
KXPI-LD (second digital subchannel) in Pocatello / Idaho Falls, Idaho
WDFX-TV in Dothan, Alabama

Former
WGRB (later WBKI-TV) in Campbellsville / Louisville, Kentucky (1990 to 1997)